Radoniaina Rabemanantsoa (born 17 December 1997) is a Malagasy football defender who currently plays for JET Kintana.

References

1997 births
Living people
People from Antananarivo
Malagasy footballers
Madagascar international footballers
AS JET Mada players
JET Kintana players
Association football defenders